Camden Health Partners, known as Haverstock Healthcare until 2021 is a federation based in the London Borough of Camden, established in 2008. It was formed to allow local GPs to form an organisation large enough to compete with firms bidding for NHS contracts in the borough. This was with a view to keeping services accessible, local and safe for the local population. The original membership comprised all 35 GP practices in Camden.

It was formed by three local GPs (Dr Jeremy Sandford, Dr John Horton and Dr Caroline Sayer). Dr Sayer is the current Chair; and Dr Shazia Mariam is the current Medical Director.

The federation currently has 16 member practices.

Clinical services

General practice
It has had a contract from NHS England to provide GP services at the Ordnance Unity Centre in Enfield Lock since 2014. It runs the Diabetes Integrated Practice Unit, with several providers in Camden at St Pancras Hospital.

Urgent care
It has run the urgent treatment centres at the Royal Free Hospital since 2009 and at Barnet Hospital since 2013.

It won the GP Enterprise Award in 2014 in the category "Improving Quality and Productivity" for this project where 58% of attendees at A&E were treated by the GPs, who successfully redirected a further 20% either back to the community or to other more suitable healthcare providers. They also established a case-finding model for at-risk elderly patients to pro-actively manage patients in the community before they present at the A&E. This has been identified as a contributing factor to saving nearly two wards' worth of beds.

References

External links
 

General practice organizations
Private providers of NHS services
Medical and health organisations based in England
Health in the London Borough of Camden